Battle of Mekelle may refer to: 

Battle of Mekelle (1896)
Battle of Mekelle (2020)